Facundo Conte (born 25 August 1989) is an Argentine professional volleyball player. He is a member of the Argentina national team and a bronze medallist at the Olympic Games Tokyo 2020. He plays for Ciudad Vóley at the professional club level.

Personal life
Facundo was born in Vicente López, Argentina. His father, Hugo Conte, is a former volleyball player, part of the team which was a 1988 Olympic Games bronze medallist. He finished his secondary studies in Centro Cultural Italiano in Olivos.

Career
Facundo's first participation with the Argentine national volleyball team took place during the U19 World Championship (4th place) in 2007. He debuted at the senior level during the 2008 America's Cup, held in Brazil (4th place). Conte was also a part of the junior national team that won the 2008 South American Championship, defeating Brazil in the final and breaking a 26–year period without winning the tournament.

In 2009, Conte played his first World League, finishing 5th with Argentina. After that participation, the player joined Italian team Zinella Bologna, where he was coached by his father Hugo. During that year, Conte also helped Argentina finish third at the U21 World Championship, the country's best position in the history of the tournament.

In 2010, Conte participated at the World League, but this time Argentina was unsuccessful, losing all 14 games. In September of that year, Conte was selected by coach Javier Weber to participate at the World Championship.

In 2015, Conte won a gold medal in the 2015 Pan American Games.

In 2013, he signed a contract with Polish club PGE Skra Bełchatów. He won the title of the Polish Champion in 2014. On 8 October 2014, his team won the Polish SuperCup. In February 2015, he signed a new two–year contract with Skra until 2017. On 7 February 2016, alongside Skra, he won the Polish Cup after beating ZAKSA in the final. On 29 April 2016, he left team from Bełchatów.

After competing in PlusLiga for three seasons, Conte signed a contract with Shanghai Golden Age, playing for two seasons. In 2017, he was transferred to El Jaish in Qatar for the Qatar Cup and Emir Cup competitions.

Honours

Clubs
 FIVB Club World Championship
  Betim 2019 – with Sada Cruzeiro
 CSV South American Club Championship
  Contagem 2020 – with Sada Cruzeiro
 CEV Challenge Cup
  2010/2011 – with Lube Banca Macerata
 National championships
 2005/2006  Argentine Championship, with Rosario Sonder
 2013/2014  Polish Championship, with PGE Skra Bełchatów
 2014/2015  Polish SuperCup, with PGE Skra Bełchatów
 2015/2016  Polish Cup, with PGE Skra Bełchatów
 2016/2017  Chinese Championship, with Shanghai Golden Age
 2017/2018  Chinese Championship, with Shanghai Golden Age
 2018/2019  Brazilian Championship, with Vôlei Taubaté
 2019/2020  Brazilian Cup, with Sada Cruzeiro
 2020/2021  Brazilian Cup, with Sada Cruzeiro

Youth national team
 2006  CSV U19 South American Championship
 2008  CSV U21 South American Championship

Individual awards
 2014: Polish SuperCup – Most Valuable Player
 2015: CEV Champions League – Best Outside Spiker
 2015: Pan American Games – Most Valuable Player
 2016: Polish Cup – Best Receiver
 2016: Polish Championship – Best Server
 2019: FIVB Club World Championship – Best Outside Spiker
 2020: CSV South American Club Championship – Best Outside Hitter

References

External links

 
 Player profile at LegaVolley.it 
 Player profile at PlusLiga.pl 
 Player profile at Volleybox.net
 
 

1989 births
Living people
People from Vicente López Partido
Sportspeople from Buenos Aires Province
Argentine men's volleyball players
Olympic volleyball players of Argentina
Argentine Champions of men's volleyball
Polish Champions of men's volleyball
Volleyball players at the 2012 Summer Olympics
Volleyball players at the 2016 Summer Olympics
Volleyball players at the 2020 Summer Olympics
Medalists at the 2020 Summer Olympics
Olympic bronze medalists for Argentina
Olympic medalists in volleyball
Pan American Games medalists in volleyball
Pan American Games gold medalists for Argentina
Medalists at the 2015 Pan American Games
Volleyball players at the 2015 Pan American Games
Argentine expatriate sportspeople in Italy
Expatriate volleyball players in Italy
Argentine expatriate sportspeople in Russia
Expatriate volleyball players in Russia
Argentine expatriate sportspeople in Poland
Expatriate volleyball players in Poland
Argentine expatriate sportspeople in China
Expatriate volleyball players in China
Argentine expatriate sportspeople in Qatar
Expatriate volleyball players in Qatar
Argentine expatriate sportspeople in Brazil
Expatriate volleyball players in Brazil
Skra Bełchatów players
Warta Zawiercie players
Outside hitters